Tora Tora Tora may refer to:
Tora! Tora! Tora!, a 1970 Japanese-American war film
Tora Tora Tora (album), a 1995 EP by the Melvins
"Tora Tora Tora" (song), a 1994 song by Domino
 "Tora! Tora! Tora!", a 1981 song by Depeche Mode from the album Speak & Spell

See also
Tora (disambiguation)